Released in 2010, Moments with Allah is the seventh album released by Ahmed Bukhatir. It consists of ten nasheeds: six in Arabic, three in English and one, his first ever, in French. The album was sponsored by Du Telecom of UAE, of which Bukhatir is an ambassador.

Track listing 
Moments with Allah Track Listing

Notes and references

External links
Official Website
Album

Ahmed Bukhatir albums
2010 albums